Blagoje "Moša" Marjanović (9 September 1907 – 1 October 1984) was a Serbian football player and manager.

Early life
Born to merchant father Dimitrije and housewife mother Sofija, young Blagoje grew up on the outskirts of Belgrade in 7 Đakovačka Street with his older brother Nikola who was also a footballer.

Playing career
Blagoje Marjanović was one of the best football forwards in the Kingdom of Yugoslavia. He played for BSK (1926–39), with whom he won five league titles (1931, 1933, 1935, 1936, and 1939) and three times was the best league goal scorer (1930, 1935, 1937).

After returning from South America, this excellent striker became (alongside his teammate Tirnanić), first professional footballer in Yugoslavia (although he had a little bit higher salary then Tirnanić). For his services at BSK Marjanović was paid YUS1,800 per month. The exchange rate of the dinar against the US dollar in December 1930 was $1 = YUS56.39 meaning that his monthly salary was $32 (about $446 in 2014 dollar). He and Tirnanić formed one of the greatest partnerships in Yugoslavian football history. Although he understood Tirnanić very well, he had almost the same understanding with other teammates, from his club and from the national team. Marjanović was a highly intelligent player, and he was able to realize, how each of his teammates plays. During the game, it always seemed that he knew what to do with or without a ball (especially during goalscoring situations in the opponent's penalty box, when he was highly unpredictable and very clever). He was a very accurate shooter, but with average shot power. Moša could score from almost every position (he scored quite a few goals with his back heel, chest, and sometimes even stomach) and he didn't care if the ball came low or high, because he was, also, very good in the air. His main specialty was volley shots. Besides that, he was also one of the best free-kick takers in Yugoslavia.

International career
For the national team, he debuts on 28 June 1926 in a friendly match against Czechoslovakia (2–6) in Zagreb. The first goal he scored on 15 May 1927 against Bulgaria in Sofia when in the last five minutes he scored two goals in the match. During his career, he scored 37 goals in 58 games for the national team (unbroken record, until Bobek came, and scored 38 goals in 63 games, although Marjanović has a better scoring ratio at 0,63 goals per game), and 575 goals in 14 seasons for his club BSK. He participated in the 1928 Olympic Games in Amsterdam, and in the first FIFA World Cup in Uruguay, in which he helped his nation win a bronze medal. He scored one goal in that tournament in a game against Bolivia. By an administrative decision by FIFA in 1986, Yugoslavia was placed in 4th place in that tournament, just behind the USA team, although the match for third place was never played. FIFA was guided by the fact that the teams of the USA and Yugoslavia had the same number of wins and losses in the championship (2–1), but the USA had a better goal difference, so FIFA officially takes the USA as third place in the 1930 World Cup. But the match for third place was not played, so the eternal question of which team was better will remain open.

Marjanović scored a few hat-trick for his nation national, most memorably against Brazil in 1934, in a friendly game in Belgrade, to help his side to an 8–4 win. Many football experts of that time showed great appreciation for "Moša's" skills, including Hugo Meisl (creator and coach of the Austrian "Wunderteam") who claimed that with Marjanović in the attacking line "Wunderteam" would be perfect. He then won back-to-back Balkan Cups with Yugoslavia, in 1934–35 and 1935, contributing with 1 and 3 goals respectively. With 9 goals in the Balkan Cup, he is among the all-time top goalscorers in the competition's history. He played his last match for the national team on 3 April 1938 against Poland in a World Cup qualifier, going off in style as he netted the only goal of the match.

According to a biography of his time, Marjanović scored more than 1,000 goals in his career.

Personal life
Marjanovic enjoyed great fame. He was a national superstar but also a playboy, up to the moment when his club played against Hajduk, in Split. On the eve of the match, he met a Dalmatian girl who supported Hajduk. They married in 1938 with great interest of the public and journalists. During the German invasion on Yugoslavia, he was captured as a truck driver of the Yugoslav Royal Army and placed in a prison camp in Fürstenberg, Germany. In the midst of adversity, sometimes they organized football matches between "war prisoners" versus "the guardians". When the war ended, he returned to Yugoslavia and played for Dinamo Pančevo (1945–48). His career ended in Proleter from Osijek (1949).

Coaching career
During his coaching career, he first led Proleter Osijek then OFK Beograd, with whom he won the national cup in 1955. After this, Marshal Tito honored Marjanovic with the Yugoslavian Order of Merit of the People. Also in 1955, Marjanović went on a tour to Asia where he had the honor to meet Chinese People's Leader Mao Zedong. He was later a coach in the Italian league (one year in AC Torino and one year in Calcio Catania). He returned to Yugoslavia and became a coach for FK Pobeda. After a match in 1961, Moša suffered a stroke. He never regained his speech and the right side of his body was paralyzed. He died in 1984. In the former Yugoslavia, he was also remembered for his statement: Football is my life.

Film
In the films Montevideo, God Bless You! (2010) and See You in Montevideo (2014), Marjanović was portrayed by actor Petar Strugar.

International goals
Yugoslavia's goal tally first

Honours

Player

Club
SK Jugoslavija
 Yugoslav Championship: 1924
BSK Beograd
 Yugoslav Championship: 1930–31, 1932–33, 1934–35, 1935–36, 1938–39
 Yugoslav Cup: 1934

International
Yugoslavia
 Balkan Cup: 1934–35 and 1935.
 Balkan Cup runner-up: 1929–31 and 1933

Manager
BSK Beograd
 Yugoslav Cup: 1955

References

External links
 Blagoje Marjanović at Reprezentacija.rs
 

1907 births
1984 deaths
Footballers from Belgrade
Association football forwards
Yugoslav footballers
Serbian footballers
Yugoslavia international footballers
Olympic footballers of Yugoslavia
Footballers at the 1928 Summer Olympics
1930 FIFA World Cup players
Yugoslav football managers
Yugoslav expatriate football managers
Serbian football managers
SK Jugoslavija players
OFK Beograd players
OFK Beograd managers
FK Čukarički players
FK Dinamo Pančevo players
NK Osijek players
Yugoslav First League players
Serie A managers
Torino F.C. managers
Expatriate football managers in Italy
Yugoslav expatriate sportspeople in Italy